Elizabeth Amy Dillwyn (16 May 1845 – 13 December 1935) was a Welsh novelist, businesswoman, and social benefactor. She was one of the first female industrialists in Britain.

Born in Sketty, Swansea, Dillwyn was a member of a prominent family. Her father was industrialist and politician Lewis Llewelyn Dillwyn, her older sister was lepidopterist Mary De la Beche Nicholl, her paternal uncle was botanist and photographer John Dillwyn Llewelyn, her paternal aunt was photographer Mary Dillwyn, and her paternal first cousin was astronomer and photographer Thereza Dillwyn Llewelyn. Dillwyn's paternal grandfather was the businessman, naturalist, and politician Lewis Weston Dillwyn, while her maternal grandfather was geologist and palaeontologist Henry De la Beche. Dillwyn's paternal great-grandfather was the American abolitionist William Dillwyn, who had migrated to Great Britain. 

From the 1870s to the early 1890s, Dillwyn, wrote 6 novels. Her themes included feminism, social reform, and a favorable view of the Rebecca Riots (1839-1843) in response to unfair taxation. Following her father's death in 1892, Dillwyn inherited his spelter works at Llansamlet and his debts. She personally managed the industry, and by 1899 had fully repaid her father's debts. In 1902, she turned her business into a registered company. She joined the National Union of Women's Suffrage Societies, and campaigned for women's suffrage.

Dillwyn never married, but considered herself married to "her wife" Olive Talbot. She was nicknamed ‘The Pioneer’ by friends.

Family
Elizabeth Amy Dillwyn was born in Wales, UK, on 16 May 1845, in Sketty in Swansea. She was the daughter of Lewis Llewelyn Dillwyn and Elizabeth (née De la Beche). She had an older sister and brother, Mary (b. 1839)(Mary De la Beche Nicholl) and Henry (b. 1843) and a younger sister, Sarah (b. 1852).

Her uncle was John Dillwyn-Llewelyn of Penllergare who, along with his wife Emma Thomasina Talbot, his sister (Amy's aunt) Mary Dillwyn and his daughter (Amy's cousin) Theresa Story Maskelyne (née Dillwyn-Llewellyn) were pioneers of early photography. Her paternal grandfather was the naturalist Lewis Weston Dillwyn and her maternal grandfather was geologist Henry De la Beche. The Dillwyn family were originally Quakers and her great-grandfather was William Dillwyn, the anti-slavery campaigner from Pennsylvania who returned to campaign in Britain.

Her father became a Liberal MP (1855–1892), and was the owner of the Dillwyn Spelter Works at Swansea.

Biography

In 1864 her fiancé, Llewelyn Thomas of Llwynmadog, died shortly before their planned wedding. Research into Dillwyn's life has also shown a close relationship with Olive Talbot through letters, who she called her 'wife' in diaries. From this, some theorize the unrequited love in her novels was inspired by this real relationship. In 1866 her mother died. Between 1880 and her father's death in 1892 she had six novels published.

Following the deaths of her brother in 1890 and her father in 1892 Amy Dillwyn lost the family home at Hendrefoilan due to it being entailed to the male line, but inherited her father's debts of over £100,000 (£8 million or more today). She wore a bright purple skirt, with a yellow rose in her belt and flowers in her hat to her father's funeral, in a statement against the Victorian conventions of elaborate funerals, which could cause families to get into debt through buying mourning clothing in haste.

She was able to rescue her father's spelter works at Llansamlet, which she managed herself and thus saved 300 jobs. Dillwyn lived in lodgings until the business was saved, eventually moving into Tŷ Glyn, her home for the rest of her life. It took until 1899 for "Dillwyn & Co". to pay off the last of its creditors, and begin returning a profit. In 1902, Dillwyn registered the business as a registered company.

She was a strong supporter of social justice and gave her support to striking seamstresses. Her unorthodox appearance, her habit of smoking cigars and lifestyle made her a well-known figure in the local community. When the National Union of Women's Suffrage Societies was formed at the turn of the century, Dillwyn joined as one of the earliest supporters in Wales. Although rejecting the militant actions of some members, she was still a staunch member of the movement.

Death
She died in Swansea on 13 December 1935, at the age of ninety, was cremated and her ashes buried in the churchyard of St Paul's Church, Sketty. Probate was granted to Rice Mansel Dillwyn and her estate was valued at £114,513 7s 9d.

Legacy 
Her house, Tŷ Glyn (now Mumbles Nursing Home), still stands at West Cross, Swansea and a Blue plaque has been installed on its boundary wall.

Currently Professor Kirsti Bohata, cited below, is writing a study of Amy Dillwyn as part of a research project at CREW, Centre for Research into the English Literature and Language of Wales at Swansea University.

In 2018, Dillwyn (representing women in business) was chosen as one of the top 100 Welsh Women by Women's Equality Network Wales, in their project to mark the centenary of the Representation of the People Act 1918, granting some women the vote.

Amy Dillwyn's life has inspired works of art and drama.

Novels 
Amy Dillwyn started writing in the 1870s, stating 'I've an idea I will try and write one chapter and see how I like it'. The Rebecca Rioter (as The Rebecca Rioter: A Story of Killay Life) was published by Macmillan in 1880, by 'E. A. Dillwyn.' Telling the fictionalized account of a Rebecca rioter, loyal to the cause even when transported to Australia, the novel shows Dillwyn's political views, liberal toward the Rebecca riots and against English rule, despite her father's part in squashing the riots. Both The Rebecca Riots and Chloe Arguelle were translated into Russian by liberal intelligentsia. Painting and Bohata identify recurring themes in her novels of crusading social reform, unrequited love, criticism of the upper class. Feminist concerns predominate, however, and many of her stories had tomboyish women as protagonists. Dillwyn also anonymously contributed to the Spectator regularly in the 1880s.

Works
 The Rebecca Rioter (1880) (reprinted 2004 by Honno)
 Chloe Arguelle (1881)
 A Burglary; or Unconscious Influence (1883) (reprinted 2009 by Honno)
 Jill (1884) (reprinted 2013 by Honno)
 Nant Olchfa (serialized in The Red Dragon: The National Magazine of Wales, Vols X-XI, 1886–7)
 Jill and Jack (1887)
 Maggie Steele's Diary (1892)

Further reading
 David Painting, Amy Dillwyn (1987)
 David Painting: Amy Dillwyn, Cardiff : University of Wales Press, 2013, 
 Jane Aaron, Nineteenth Women's Writing in Wales: Nation, Gender and Identity, Llandybïe: University Press.

References

External links 
 The Dilwyn Project - Research project by Swansea University 
 The Life and Fiction of Amy Dillwyn - Research project by Swansea University, led by Dr. Kirsti Bohata.

1845 births
1935 deaths
19th-century British businesswomen
20th-century British businesswomen
19th-century Welsh businesspeople
20th-century Welsh businesspeople
19th-century Welsh novelists
19th-century Welsh women writers
20th-century Welsh women
Welsh suffragists
People from Swansea
Welsh women novelists
Welsh industrialists
Welsh people of American descent
Welsh women in business
Dillwyn family